Mário Aníbal Dias Sampaio Ramos (born 25 March 1972 in Nova Sintra, Angola) is a former Portuguese decathlete.

Achievements

External links

infopedia

1972 births
Living people
Portuguese decathletes
Athletes (track and field) at the 2000 Summer Olympics
Olympic athletes of Portugal
Portuguese sportspeople of Angolan descent
S.L. Benfica athletes

Portuguese people of Angolan descent